The TransJakarta Corridor 7 is the TransJakarta bus rapid transit route which operates from the Kampung Rambutan Bus Terminal to the Kampung Melayu Bus Terminal. The roads that pass through corridor 7 are Jalan Otto Iskandardinata, Jalan MT Haryono, Jalan Mayjen Sutoyo, Jalan Bogor Raya and Jalan Gedong Timur/Barat. This corridor is the only TransJakarta corridor that is not integrated with the KRL Commuterline because the distance between the Kampung Melayu stop and the nearest Commuterline station, namely Tebet Station, is quite far.

Corridor 7, along with corridor 4, 5, and 6 was inaugurated on January 27, 2007 after having a trial run since December 2006. 

From October 23, 2017, a toll/express route operates between Kampung Rambutan and Kampung Melayu during the morning peak hours of 05.00-09.00. The toll/express route uses the toll road to avoid traffic jams in the regular corridor. From Kampung Rambutan, the route turns towards Tanah Merdeka and enters the toll road, exiting at Cawang UKI-Cawang BNN-Cawang Otista-Gelangang Remaja-Bidara Cina-Kampung Melayu.

List of BRT Stations 
 Bidara Cina will serve as terminus temporarily from 7 January 2023 until the completion of renovated Kampung Melayu BRT station.
 Currently, all bus stops are served by buses 24 hours a day, served by M7 from Kp. Rambutan up to BNN and M5 for the rest of the line.
 Italic text indicates that the BRT Station is temporarily closed for renovation.

Cross-corridor routes

Corridor 7F (Kampung Rambutan–Juanda via Cempaka Putih) 
 Only operates at weekdays (Monday-Friday) and closed on public holidays.
 Starting from March 4, 2023, corridor 7F began to shorten its route to the Juanda BRT station temporarily, due to the construction of the Jakarta MRT Phase 2A.
 Stations indicated by a <- sign has a one way service towards Kampung Rambutan only. The bus then continues to Galur. Stations indicated by a -> sign has a one way service towards Juanda only.
 Italic text indicates that the BRT station is temporarily closed for renovation or the bus do not stop at the station.

Corridor 7M (Kampung Rambutan–Pulogadung 2) 

 Italic text indicates that the BRT Station is temporarily closed for renovation or the bus do not stop at the station.

Depots 

 Cijantung (MYS)
 Cawang (PPD)
 Ciputat (PPD)

Incidents 

 On 24 May 2017, two explosions occurred at the in Kampung Melayu BRT Station and bus terminal. The Police confirmed that the explosions were caused by multiple explosive devices found in the toilet and in another part of the terminal. The bombings killed five people: three policemen and two attackers. The 11 injured people were taken to multiple hospitals across the Eastern Jakarta area.

See also 

 TransJakarta
 List of TransJakarta corridors

References

External links 
 

TransJakarta
Bus routes